This is the 2017 transfer window for Brazilian football season 2017. Additionally, players without a club may join at any time, clubs may sign players on loan at any time, and clubs may sign a goalkeeper on an emergency loan if they have no registered goalkeeper available.

Transfers

All Players without a flag are Brazilian.

References

Brazil
Brazil
2017
Transfers